Smoky Trails is a 1939 American Western film directed by Bernard B. Ray and written by George H. Plympton. The film stars Bob Steele, Jean Carmen, Murdock MacQuarrie, Bruce Dane, Carleton Young and Ted Adams. The film was released on March 3, 1939, by Metropolitan Pictures Corporation.

Plot
Bob Archer was after his father's killer, when he finds a man in the middle of a gunfight, he helps the man escape, but the man knocks Bob out. Bob is taken to the Sheriff and arrested. Bob realizes that the man who he saved is actually his father's killer and asks to be released. Then disguises himself as a criminal and enters the gang's hideout to find that man again.

Cast           
Bob Steele as Bob Archer
Jean Carmen as Marie
Murdock MacQuarrie as Will Archer 
Bruce Dane as Cookie
Carleton Young as Mort 
Ted Adams as Outlaw Leader
Frank LaRue as Sheriff
Jimmy Aubrey as Jeff 
Bob Terry as Burke
Frank Wayne as Sloan

References

External links
 

1939 films
American Western (genre) films
1939 Western (genre) films
Films directed by Bernard B. Ray
Films with screenplays by George H. Plympton
1930s English-language films
1930s American films